Forest Hill station or Forest Hills station may refer to:

Australia
 Forest Hill railway station, Queensland

Canada
 Forest Hill station (Toronto), an under-construction station on Line 5 Eglinton of the Toronto subway system

United Kingdom
 Forest Hill railway station, railway station in Forest Hill, London, now used by British National Rail

United States
 Forest Hill station (Muni Metro), a Muni Metro station in San Francisco
 Forest Hills station (LIRR), a Long Island Rail Road station in Queens, New York
 Forest Hills station (MBTA), an MBTA multimodal station in Boston, Massachusetts
 Forest Hills station (SEPTA), a SEPTA Regional Rail station in Philadelphia, Pennsylvania
 Forest Hills–71st Avenue (IND Queens Boulevard Line), a New York City Subway station in Queens, New York